Viktorija Todorovska (born 26 November 2000) is a Macedonian cross-country skier. She competed in the 2018 Winter Olympics.

References

2000 births
Living people
Cross-country skiers at the 2018 Winter Olympics
Macedonian female cross-country skiers
Olympic cross-country skiers of North Macedonia